Rhombophryne ellae is a species of frog in the family Microhylidae. It is endemic to Montagne d'Ambre National Park in the northern Madagascar. The species was discovered soon after it was possibly forced out of its habitat by Cyclone Ava.

References

ellae
Endemic frogs of Madagascar
Amphibians described in 2020
Taxa named by Mark D. Scherz